Sha Chau and Lung Kwu Chau Marine Park is a marine park located on the west waters of Hong Kong, China. The islands of Lung Kwu Chau, Sha Chau and Pak Chau (Tree island) are located within the boundaries of the park.

Description 
The Sha Chau and Lung Kwu Chau Marine Park is located off Hong Kong to the west of New Territories and was protected starting on 22November 1996. An area of about  has been protected. Yellow buoys on the four corners of the marine park are used to mark itsboundaries.

Fauna and flora 
Under the influence of the Pearl River on the west, the water has a low salinity level and high organic nutrients. This is also increases the diversity of marine fauna and flora, and also provides the perfect area for sea creatures to live in. The Sha Chau and Lung Kwu Chau Marine Parks is for its richness in marine resources and its habitat for the rare Chinese white dolphin (Sousa chinensis chinensis).

Sha Chau 
On Sha Chau, a noted scenic spot is the Tin Hau Temple. This temple was built during the Qing dynasty in the year 1846. Fishermen and other people who worked at sea came to this temple to pray to Mazu, Goddess of the Sea.

References

External links 

 Agriculture, Fisheries and Conservation Department: Sha Chau and Lung Kwu Chau Marine Park

Marine parks of Hong Kong
Tuen Mun District